Santa Ynez (Spanish for "St. Agnes") is a census-designated place (CDP) in the Santa Ynez Valley of Santa Barbara County, California.

The town of Santa Ynez is one of the communities of the Santa Ynez Valley. It features the Santa Ynez Airport for general aviation, with a paved  runway. The population was 4,505 at the 2020 census, up from 4,418 at the 2010 census. Santa Ynez is the archaic spelling of Santa Inés in the Spanish, meaning Saint Agnes.

Geography

Climate
This region experiences warm (but not hot) and dry summers, with no average monthly temperatures above . According to the Köppen Climate Classification system, Santa Ynez has a warm-summer Mediterranean climate, abbreviated Csb on climate maps.

Demographics

2010
At the 2010 census Santa Ynez had a population of 4,418. The racial makeup of Santa Ynez was 3,797 (85.9%) White, 12 (0.3%) African American, 234 (5.3%) Native American, 51 (1.2%) Asian, 4 (0.1%) Pacific Islander, 147 (3.3%) from other races, and 173 (3.9%) from two or more races. Hispanic or Latino of any race were 639 people (14.5%).

The whole population lived in households, no one lived in non-institutionalized group quarters and no one was institutionalized.

There were 1,741 households, 524 (30.1%) had children under the age of 18 living in them, 1,052 (60.4%) were opposite-sex married couples living together, 137 (7.9%) had a female householder with no husband present, 81 (4.7%) had a male householder with no wife present. There were 82 (4.7%) unmarried opposite-sex partnerships, and 18 (1.0%) same-sex married couples or partnerships. 367 households (21.1%) were one person and 186 (10.7%) had someone living alone who was 65 or older. The average household size was 2.54. There were 1,270 families (72.9% of households); the average family size was 2.91.

The age distribution was 916 people (20.7%) under the age of 18, 280 people (6.3%) aged 18 to 24, 785 people (17.8%) aged 25 to 44, 1,559 people (35.3%) aged 45 to 64, and 878 people (19.9%) who were 65 or older. The median age was 47.8 years. For every 100 females, there were 96.3 males. For every 100 females age 18 and over, there were 91.7 males.

The homeowner vacancy rate was 1.3%; the rental vacancy rate was 11.3%. 3,434 people (77.7% of the population) lived in owner-occupied housing units and 984 people (22.3%) lived in rental housing units.

2000
At the 2000 census there were 4,584 people, 1,627 households, and 1,277 families in the CDP. The racial makeup of the CDP was 91.84% White, 0.17% African American, 1.22% Native American, 1.29% Asian, 0.02% Pacific Islander, 3.08% from other races, and 2.38% from two or more races. Hispanic or Latino of any race were 9.21%.

Of the 1,627 households 36.3% had children under the age of 18 living with them, 68.0% were married couples living together, 7.4% had a female householder with no husband present, and 21.5% were non-families. 15.5% of households were one person and 7.0% were one person aged 65 or older. The average household size was 2.78 and the average family size was 3.09.

The age distribution was 26.2% under the age of 18, 4.7% from 18 to 24, 25.5% from 25 to 44, 28.8% from 45 to 64, and 14.9% 65 or older. The median age was 42 years. For every 100 females, there were 90.7 males. For every 100 females age 18 and over, there were 88.4 males.

The median household income was $80,284 and the median family income  was $84,467. Males had a median income of $56,286 versus $45,688 for females. The per capita income for the CDP was $33,811. About 3.0% of families and 5.5% of the population were below the poverty line, including 7.1% of those under age 18 and 2.4% of those age 65 or over.

The Santa Ynez Band of Chumash Mission Indians, a federally recognized Chumash tribe is headquartered in Santa Ynez. They operate the local Chumash Casino Resort.

Government

Notable residents 
 Bob Falkenburg, professional tennis player
 Ed Fitz Gerald, professional baseball player
 Eion Bailey, actor
 Tyler Boyd, professional soccer player
 John Corbett, actor
 Bo Derek, actor
Rona Barrett, actor
Olivia Newton-John, Singer, actor
 Michael Jackson, Singer

See also
 Neverland Ranch
 Lake Cachuma
 California State Route 154
 Rancho del Cielo
 Santa Ynez Valley

References

External links

Santa Ynez Valley News
Santa Ynez Valley Online News and Information
Chumash Casino
Santa Ynez Airport

Census-designated places in Santa Barbara County, California
Santa Ynez Valley
Census-designated places in California